1944 is a 2015 Estonian war drama film directed by Elmo Nüganen. The film first premiered in February 2015 in Berlin, Germany, before its release in Estonia and other Northern European countries. It was selected as the Estonian entry for the Best Foreign Language Film at the 88th Academy Awards but it was not nominated.

As the Soviet Union advances to recapture Estonia from its German occupiers, with huge losses on both sides, the film explores the mental conflicts of young Estonians. Some have volunteered or been conscripted into the German military, most with little commitment to the Nazi regime. Others have volunteered or been conscripted into the Soviet forces, again with little commitment to the Communist regime. Whichever side wins will regard the Estonians on the opposing side as traitors, liable to execution or deportation. Neither side offers the Estonians autonomy from foreign control.

Plot
The film opens in July 1944 on the Tannenberg Line in Estonia, where a unit of Estonian Waffen-SS soldiers are fighting the advancing Red Army. A visit by a Nazi official, who hands out signed photographs of Hitler, attracts ridicule. The Soviet forces are superior in numbers of tanks and infantry and the German forces have to retreat through streams of civilian refugees. After a ferocious battle, the victors are a Red Army Estonian unit.

As they bury the dead of both sides in a mass grave, an Estonian in the Red Army called Jüri searches the body of an Estonian in the German forces called Karl and finds an unposted letter to Karl's sister Aino in Tallinn. When the Soviets capture the city, he delivers the letter in person and he and Aino become friendly, which incurs the enmity of his unit's political officer. Back fighting on the Sõrve Peninsula in November, his unit captures a group of sixteen-year-old Estonian boys in German uniform. The political officer orders Jüri to kill them all and, when he questions the decision, shoots Jüri dead. The officer himself is executed by one of Jüri's comrades seconds later. On Jüri's body, a comrade finds an unposted letter to Aino which he, when he has a spell of leave, delivers in person.

Cast
 Kaspar Velberg as Sturmmann Karl Tammik
 Kristjan Üksküla as Senior sergeant Jüri Jõgi 
 Maiken Schmidt as Aino Tammik
 Gert Raudsep as Oberscharführer Ants Saareste 
 Ain Mäeots as Captain Evald Viires
 Peeter Tammearu as a Partorg (Communist Party official)
 Märt Pius and Priit Pius as the Käär Brothers
 Hendrik Toompere Jr. Jr. as Rottenführer Kristjan Põder
 Kristjan Sarv as Abram Joffe  
 Rain Simmul as Prohhor Sedõhh
 Martin Mill as Alfred Tuul
 Ivo Uukkivi as Rudolf Kask
 Marko Leht as Valter Hein 
 Mait Malmsten as Government figure
 Magnús Mariuson as The Dane Carl 
 Pääru Oja as Oberschütze (Sanitar) Elmar Säinas 
 Külli Teetamm as Mother with children
 Kristo Viiding as Leonhard Talu 
 Karl-Andreas Kalmet as Vladimir Kamenski
 Henrik Kalmet	as Voldemar Piir
 Priit Loog as Paul Mets
 Priit Strandberg as Lembit Raadik
 Andero Ermel as Oskar Lepik
 Jaak Prints as Richard Pastak
 Tõnu Oja as Omakaitse lieutenant
 Anne Reemann as Omakaitse female fighter
 Anne Margiste	as Farm woman

Production
The first part of filming took place in October 2013 till the Easter break of 2014. It then continued at the start of the summer of 2014 where filming also took place at the Sinimäed Hills.

The film was funded by the Estonian Film Institute, the Estonian Ministry of Defence, the Cultural Endowment of Estonia and private investments.

Reception
On the film aggregation website IMDb, 1944 has a weighted average score of 7.5/10, based on votes from 1,005 users.

The film has been banned in the Russian Federation.

Box office
In Estonia, 1944 was a huge box office success. With local opening weekend admissions at 19,030 1944 set a new opening weekend record for an Estonian film, beating the previous record of 15,611 admissions set by Names in Marble in 2002. 1944's first week also broke records by achieving 44,879 admissions, the highest ever for an Estonian film that premiered in Estonia.

See also
List of submissions to the 88th Academy Awards for Best Foreign Language Film
List of Estonian submissions for the Academy Award for Best Foreign Language Film

References

External links
 

2015 war drama films
2015 films
Estonian war drama films
Estonian-language films
Eastern Front of World War II films
Films set in 1944
Films directed by Elmo Nüganen
World War II films based on actual events
2015 drama films
Baltic states World War II films